Polyplex may refer to:
 Polyplex, a complex of a polymer and DNA
 Polyplex (company), an Indian company which manufactures BOPET